Scotland Yard is a 1930 American pre-Code crime film directed by William K. Howard, written by Garrett Fort, and starring Edmund Lowe, Joan Bennett, Donald Crisp, Georges Renavent, Lumsden Hare and David Torrence. It was released on October 19, 1930, by Fox Film Corporation. It is based on the 1929 play Scotland Yard by Denison Clift. In 1941, the film was remade under the same title.

The film depicts identity theft. A financier who went missing in action during World War I is impersonated by a swindler.

Synopsis
In London following the First World War, a criminal masquerades of a financier who had gone missing in action with the intent of stealing large sums of money.

Cast        
Edmund Lowe as Sir John Lasher / Dakin Barrolles
Joan Bennett as Xandra, Lady Lasher
Donald Crisp as Charles Fox
Georges Renavent as Dr. Dean
Lumsden Hare as Sir Clive Heathcote
David Torrence as Captain Graves
Barbara Leonard as Nurse Cecilia
 Norman Ainsley as Reggie, Xandra's Suitor
 Adrienne D'Ambricourt as Madame Rousseau, Innkeeper 
 Halliwell Hobbes as Lord St. Arran
 Arnold Lucy as Mc Killop 
 J. Carrol Naish as Dr. Remur 
 Reginald Sharland as Lasher's Secretary

References

External links 
 

1930 films
Fox Film films
American crime films
1930 crime films
Films directed by William K. Howard
American black-and-white films
Films set in London
1930s English-language films
Films with screenplays by Garrett Fort
American films based on plays
Films about identity theft
1930s American films